is a 1986 Japanese adventure comedy-drama film about two animals, Milo (an orange tabby cat) and Otis (a pug). The original Japanese version, narrated by Shigeru Tsuyuki and with poetry recitation by Kyōko Koizumi, was released on July 12, 1986. Columbia Pictures removed 15 minutes from the original film and released a shorter English-language version, written by Mark Saltzman and narrated by Dudley Moore, on August 25, 1989.

Plot
The film opens on Nippon Farm, with a mother cat who has given birth to kittens. One of the kittens is named Milo, or Chatran in the Japanese version (literally Brown Tiger), and has a habit of being too curious and getting himself into trouble. He finds a pug puppy named Otis, or Poosky in the Japanese version, and they soon become friends. When Milo is hiding inside a box floating in the river, it breaks loose and he accidentally drifts downstream. Otis runs after Milo, who himself goes on many adventures, escaping one obstacle after another.

Milo encounters a bear, escapes from a raven and Deadwood Swamp, steals a dead muskrat from a fox, follows a railroad called Nippon Bearway to the home of a deer who shelters him, sleeps in a nest with an owl, stays for a while with a pig and her piglets, catches a fish and is robbed of it by a raccoon, is mobbed by seagulls, and evades another bear, then a snake, before falling into a deep pit.

For his part, Otis follows Milo throughout, usually only an hour behind and less than a mile out of range. Finally, the two catch up with one another. While Milo is in the hole, Otis pulls him out by means of a rope. Milo and Otis are reunited, and soon find mates of their own: Joyce, a white cat, for Milo; and Sondra, a French pug, for Otis. Afterward, they briefly part ways and raise offspring of their own. Later, Milo, Otis, Joyce, and Sondra (along with their litters) happily find their way back together through the forest to their farm as the credits roll.

Characters
All characters are voiced by the narrator, Shigeru Tsuyuki (Japanese) and Dudley Moore (English).
 Milo
 Otis
 Milo's mother
 Gloria
 Gloria's chick
 Bear
 Fox
 Deer
 Owl
 Pig
 Raccoon
 Snake
 Joyce
 Sondra

Production
Director Masanori Hata and associate director Kon Ichikawa edited the film together from 74 hours of footage ( of film), shot over a period of four years.

Soundtrack
The original Japanese soundtrack, released as The Adventures of Chatran: Original Soundtrack, was composed by Ryuichi Sakamoto and included , a theme song performed by Keiko Yoshinaga. During the promotion of the film in Japan, the song , originally recorded by Ushiroyubi Sasaregumi for the Fuji TV anime series High School Kimengumi, was used in commercials for the film.

The musical score for the English-language version was composed by Michael Boddicker. Music was borrowed from Elmer Bernstein's score to To Kill a Mockingbird (specifically the two cues, "Roll in the Tire" and "Peek-a-boo" with minor changes in the music), and John Williams' score to The Witches of Eastwick (using these cues "The Township of Eastwick" and "Have Another Cherry!", again with minor changes in the music). The song "Walk Outside", written by Dick Tarrier, is performed by Dan Crow in the opening shots and end credits.

The English-language version of the film also contained music by classical composers including: 
 "Soldier's Dance" from William Tell by Gioachino Rossini
 "Serenade" by Franz Schubert
 Appalachian Spring by Aaron Copland
 "Of Foreign Lands and People" from Scenes from Childhood by Robert Schumann
 King Cotton by John Philip Sousa
 "Auf dem Wasser zu singen", D 774 by Franz Schubert
 "The Elephant" from The Carnival of the Animals by Camille Saint-Saens
 "People with Long Ears" from The Carnival of the Animals by Camille Saint-Saëns
 "Dialogue Between the Wind and the Waves" from La Mer by Claude Debussy
 Perpetuum Mobile, Op. 257 by Johann Strauss II
 "How Beautifully Blue the Sky" by Gilbert and Sullivan
 Waltz No. 16 in A-flat Major, Op. posth. by Frédéric Chopin
 Impromptu in B-flat by Franz Schubert
 "Berceuse" from Dolly Suite, Op. 56 by Gabriel Fauré
 "Bourrée" from Terpsichore by Michael Praetorius
 Piano Concerto in A minor, Op. 54 by Edvard Grieg
 "Symphony in D Minor" by Cesar Franck
 Flute Sonata in E-Flat Major, BWV 1031 by Johann Sebastian Bach

Video game adaptation
In 1986, to tie in with the original Japanese version of the film, a video game was released for the Japan-exclusive Famicom Disk System.

Release
The film was shown during the film market at the 1986 Cannes Film Festival before opening on 200 screens in Japan on July 12, 1986.

Reception

Box office
It was the number-one Japanese film on the domestic market in 1986, earning  in distribution income that year. At the time, it was the third highest-grossing film ever in Japan, beaten only by E.T. the Extra-Terrestrial (1982) and Antarctica (1983).

In the United States, The Adventures of Milo and Otis grossed , adding up to a combined  grossed in Japan and the United States.

In terms of box office admissions, the film sold  tickets in Japan,  tickets in the United States, and 1,318,750 tickets in Germany and France, for a combined  tickets sold in Japan, North America and Mainland Europe.

Home media
In 2010, the film's DVD version sold 810,334 units and grossed $5,464,010 in the United States. It was released on Blu-ray on January 24, 2012.

Critical reception
Reviews for the US version were positive, with an 80% approval rating on Rotten Tomatoes, based on 10 reviews.<ref>{{cite web |url=http://www.rottentomatoes.com/m/the_adventures_of_milo_and_otis_1986/ |title=The Adventures of Milo and Otis |publisher=Rotten Tomatoes/Flixster |access-date=2013-09-01}}</ref>

Animal cruelty allegations
When the film was first released, several Australian animal rights organizations raised allegations of animal cruelty during filming and called for a boycott. The Sunday Mail'' reported at the time that Animal Liberation Queensland founder Jacqui Kent alleged the killing of more than 20 kittens during production and added that she was disturbed by reports from Europe which alleged that other animals had been injured, as in one case where a producer had allegedly broken a cat's paw to make it appear unsteady on its feet. Other scenes that were the source of controversy were a scene of a cat falling off a cliff and trying to climb back up, and a scene of a pug fighting a bear, all of which were deleted from the American version. Kent said her organization had a number of complaints from people who had seen the film and were concerned that it could not have been made without cruelty. The Tasmanian and Victorian branches of the RSPCA also alleged abuse.

The film was reported to have the approval of the American Humane Society, despite not having their officers present during filming. The American Humane Association attempted to investigate cruelty rumors through "contacts in Europe who normally have information on movies throughout the world". While noting that the contacts had also heard the allegations, they were unable to verify them. The organization also reported, "We have tried through humane people in Japan, and through another Japanese producer to determine if these rumors are true, but everything has led to a dead end."  The same report noted that several Japanese Humane Societies allowed their names to be used in connection with the film and that the film "shows no animals being injured or harmed."

Awards
 The Japanese Academy (1987)
 Won: Popularity Award - Most Popular Film
 Nominated: Award of the Japanese Academy - Best Music Score (Ryuichi Sakamoto)
 Young Artist Awards (1990)
 Nominated: Young Artist Award - Best Family Motion Picture – Adventure

References

External links
 
 
 
 The Adventures of Milo and Otis at the Japanese Movie Database 

1986 films
1980s adventure comedy-drama films
1980s children's adventure films
Animal adventure films
Children's comedy-drama films
Japanese adventure films
1980s Japanese-language films
Japanese comedy-drama films
Japanese children's films
Columbia Pictures films
Films about cats
Films about dogs
Films shot in Japan
Films set in Japan
Toho films
Films about animals
Film controversies
Film controversies in Japan
Animal cruelty incidents in film
Films scored by Ryuichi Sakamoto
1980s children's films
1986 comedy films
1986 drama films
1980s Japanese films